"New Jack Hustler (Nino's Theme)" is a song written and performed by American recording artist Ice-T. It was released as a single from the soundtrack album to the 1991 film New Jack City and from the rapper's fourth studio album O.G. Original Gangster. It was recorded at Wide Tracks Recording Studio in Hollywood, California, produced by Alphonso "DJ Aladdin" Henderson and Tracy "Ice-T" Marrow, and released in 1991 via Warner Bros. Records. Reaching a peak position of number 67 on the US Billboard Hot 100, the single remained on the chart for a total of 8 weeks. The single was nominated for Grammy Award for Best Rap Solo Performance at 34th Annual Grammy Awards, but lost to LL Cool J's "Mama Said Knock You Out".

Background 
In the song, Ice-T raps about the life of a hustler. In the movie, Wesley Snipes plays a hustler named Nino Brown hence the title.

The song uses samples from Bobbi Humphrey's "Jasper Country Man", James Brown's "Blues and Pants", Sly and the Family Stone's "You Can Make It if You Try", Stanley Turrentine & Milt Jackson's "Sister Sanctified" and ESG's "UFO".

Track listing

Personnel
 Tracy Lauren Marrow – vocals, lyrics, producer, executive producer
 Alphonso Henderson – producer, programming, arranging
 Vachik Aghaniantz – mixing
 Dennis "Def-Pea" Parker – recording
 Steve Hall – mastering
 Dirk Walter – design
 Joel Warren – photography
 Jorge Hinojosa – management

Music video
The music video was released in 1991. It features a cameo by Mike Tyson.

Charts

References

External links 

1991 songs
1991 singles
Ice-T songs
Sire Records singles
Songs written by Ice-T
Songs about crime
Gangsta rap songs
Warner Records singles